Coladenia indrani, the tricolour pied flat, is a butterfly belonging to the family Hesperiidae found in Sri Lanka, India to Myanmar. The species was first described by Frederic Moore in 1865.

Description
In 1891, Edward Yerbury Watson described the butterfly as:

Expanse of 1.75 inches.

It is found in Odisha, Sikkim, central India and the Western Ghats.

References

Tagiadini
Butterflies of Asia
Butterflies of Indochina